Fikr Taunsvi real name Ram Lal Bhatia (7 October 1918 – 12 September 1987) was an Urdu poet, born in a village of Taunsa Sharif, then part of India. He was famous for his satires and was a Hindu by religion. He wrote twenty books in Urdu and eight in Hindi.

Personal life
His father, Dhanpat Rai, was a shopkeeper in the Baloch tribal area of Taunsa Sharif. village name was Mangrotha which is about 04 km from Taunsa Sharif. Taunsvi married Shrimati Kailashwati, in 1944. He has three children Rani, Phool Kumar and Suman.

He studied up to higher secondary school at Taunsa Sharif and higher education from Lahore. He migrated to Delhi after partition of the sub-continent. His favorite city was Lahore which according to him was attached to his soul. The decision of partition dejected him a lot.

He died on 12 September 1987.

His works
He wrote many books, and the daily column Pyaz ke Chhilke in Urdu Milap for about 27 years. His journal written during the partition of India, Chhata Darya (published in Lahore in 1948), has been translated into English by Dr Maaz Bin Bilal as The Sixth River: A Journal from the Partition of India (published by Speaking Tiger Press in 2019).

Recognition
He was awarded with Soviet Land Nehru award.

References

Hindu poets
Urdu-language poets from India
1986 deaths
1918 births
20th-century Indian poets
Indian male poets
20th-century Indian male writers
People from Dera Ghazi Khan District